Kodro is a Bosnian surname. Notable people with the surname include:

Kenan Kodro (born 1993), Bosnian footballer
Meho Kodro (born 1967), Bosnian footballer and manager

Bosnian surnames
Slavic-language surnames